Anti-Pashtun sentiment refers to fear, dislike, or hostility towards Pashtuns, Pashtun culture, or the Pashto language. This includes fear as well as resentment exhibited by non-Pashtun ethnic majorities who have suffered decades of persecution at the hands of Pashtuns, including disappearances, murder, slavery, Pashtunization, and genocide, especially the Hazaras.

Afghanistan
The traditional rivalry for power and influence between the Pashtun majority (There is no reliable statistic on Pashtun`s population and majority calculation) and the minority Farsi-Dari speaking ethnic groups of Afghanistan such as the Tajiks, Hazaras, Uzbeks and Turkmen, have often stirred anti-Pashtun sentiments among the latter. In 1975, an uprising broke out in Panjsher Valley against the rule of Afghan prime minister and Pashtun nationalist Daoud Khan, which was believed to have been "sparked by anti-Pashtun frustrations. The Settam-e-Melli, led by Tajik activist Tahir Badakhshi, has been described as "an anti-Pashtun leftist mutation." According to Nabi Misdaq, the Settem-e-Melli "had an internal programme of provoking minorities to armed resurrection to stand up to Pashtuns." The Shalleh-ye Javiyd, a Maoist political party founded in the 1960s that predominantly drew support from Shi'a Muslims and Hazaras, was also similarly opposed to Pashtun rule in Afghanistan.

However, Misdaq notes that these anti-Pashtun stances were usually engraved more in a "Shi'a-versus-Sunni Afghan", "Dari-speaking-intellectuals-versus-Pashtun-rulers" and "majority-versus-minority" context rather than resentment on misrule or mistreatment by Pashtun kings and dynasties. This could be because Afghan dynasties such as the Durrani Empire, although Pashtun by origin, had been considerably Persianised and had even adopted the Dari language over Pashto; this cultural assimilation made the Durranis culturally familiar to Dari-speaking non-Pashtuns and neutralised any ethnic hegemony.

The Rabanni government which ruled Afghanistan in the early and mid-1990s was viewed by the Taliban as corrupt, anti-Pashtun and responsible for civil war.

A Human Right Watch (HRW) report published in 2002 stated that, 'following the collapse of Taliban regime in Northern Afghanistan in 2001, a rise in Anti-Pashtun violence was reported in Northern Afghanistan. Ethnic Pashtuns from that area were subject to widespread abuses like killings, sexual violence, beatings, extortion, and looting'. The Pashtuns were particularly targeted because their ethnicity was closely associated with Taliban, which could not be neglected by any evidence. The HRW report held three ethnically-based parties like Uzbek Junbish-i-Milli Islami Afghanistan, Tajik Jamiat-e Islami and Hazara Hezbe Wahdat responsible for the abuses against Pashtuns in northern Afghanistan, but these accusations are confirmed only by the Pashtuns. Many Afghan Pashtuns also held the Northern Alliance responsible for the abuses committed against the Pashtuns communities in the rest of Afghanistan.

Pashtuns are also stereotyped as 'wild and barbaric' in Afghanistan by non-Pashtun Afghans and by some other Pashtun Sub-Tribes.

Many Afghan Pashtuns viewed the Afghan National Army (ANA) as being dominated by a Tajik-led anti-Pashtun ethnic coalition. The Tajiks, on the other hand, view the Pashtun population as largely aligned with the Taliban. This in turn has created a civil war-like situation in Afghanistan.

Pakistan
Following independence, one of the factors of resentment among Pashtun population was the British-inherited name of the North-West Frontier Province, which did not represent Pashtuns unlike provinces e.g. Punjab, Sindh, Balochistan which were all named after their resident ethnic groups. Rajmohan Gandhi mentions that "persisting with the imperial name for a former empire's frontier province was nothing but anti-Pathan discrimination."

During the 1980s, anti-Pashtun sentiments were present in Karachi among some sections of the Muhajir community. According to Maya Chadda, increased Pashtun migration to Karachi, which included Pashtun migrants from neighbouring Afghanistan due to the Soviet war, disturbed Karachi's sensitive demographics and brought about an "increasingly violent competition for land, jobs, and economic control of the city."

See also
 Pashtun colonization of northern Afghanistan 
 Persecution of Hazaras
 Persecution of Hazara people in Quetta
 Pathan joke

 Anti-Pakistan sentiment

References

Pashtun society
Pashtun politics
Racism
All articles lacking reliable references